No Obvious Signs is a 2018 Ukrainian documentary by Ukrainian director Alina Gorlova. It is a Russian-language Ukrainian film produced by Gorlova and Ukrainian producer Maria Berlinska. The film follows Ukrainian Army major Oksana Yakubova as she struggles with post-traumatic stress disorder (PTSD).

Accolades
No Obvious Signs was named the "Outstanding Eastern European Film" at the 2018 Dok Leipzig film festival.

The film was included on a list of the 100 best Ukrainian films by the National Oleksandr Dovzhenko Film Centre.

References

External links
 

2018 documentary films
Ukrainian documentary films